Rocky Linux is a Linux distribution developed by Rocky Enterprise Software Foundation, which is a privately owned benefit corporation that describes itself as a "self imposed not-for-profit". It is intended to be a downstream, complete binary-compatible release using the Red Hat Enterprise Linux (RHEL) operating system source code. The project's aim is to provide a community-supported, production-grade enterprise operating system.  Rocky Linux, along with Red Hat Enterprise Linux and SUSE Linux Enterprise, has become popular for enterprise operating system use.

The first release candidate version of Rocky Linux was released on April 30, 2021, and its first general availability version was released on June 21, 2021. Rocky Linux 8 will be supported through May 2029.

History
On December 8, 2020, Red Hat announced that they would discontinue development of CentOS, which had been a production-ready downstream version of Red Hat Enterprise Linux, in favor of a newer upstream development variant of that operating system known as "CentOS Stream". In response, Gregory Kurtzer, CEO of Rocky Linux support provider CIQ and one of the original founders of CentOS, announced that he would start a new project to achieve the original goals of CentOS. Its name was chosen as a tribute to early CentOS co-founder Rocky McGaugh. By December 12, the code repository of Rocky Linux had become the top-trending repository on GitHub.

On December 22, 2020, Rocky Linux community manager Jordan Pisaniello announced that the target for an initial release was anywhere between March and May of 2021. On January 20, 2021, it was announced that a test repository would be made available to the public by the end of February, and a release candidate was on target for the end of March 2021. However, that date was slightly pushed back, and on April 30, 2021, the first release candidate was officially released. The second release candidate, of version 8.4, the last before the stable release, was released on June 4, 2021. The high version number is based on the designation of RHEL. Rocky Linux is a clone of RHEL, which is also binary-compatible and is already supported by numerous large, financially strong sponsors. On June 21, 2021, the stable release of Rocky Linux 8.4 was released, with the code name "Green Obsidian".

Rocky Linux 9.0 was released on July 14, 2022, alongside a new reproducible build system called "Peridot", created to ensure the community can easily create new RHEL forks if Rocky Linux ever were to be discontinued, and to allow the Rocky Linux project to make new releases faster. Rocky Linux 9.0 is also the first version to support little-endian PowerPC processors and IBM Z (s390x) mainframes.

Releases 
Some of the ISO images released by the Rocky Enterprise Software Foundation have no direct upstream equivalents. They are created for specific purposes, such as for providing a live bootable image, or for providing a reduced-size installation medium. 

* Rocky Linux was announced , first beta release was 143 days later.

See also
 AlmaLinux, with development organised by a 501(c) organization
 Fedora Linux
 Red Hat Enterprise Linux

References

External links 

 
 

Enterprise Linux distributions
Linux distributions
RPM-based Linux distributions
X86-64 Linux distributions